Engie Benjy is a British stop motion pre-school children's television show, broadcast on ITV's children's strand, CITV. Engie Benjy is a blue-haired mechanic who fixes problems with the help of his friends and an assortment of living magic and vehicles. He owns a dog named Jollop and drives a breakdown van named Dan the Van. Other characters include Driver Dottie, Astronaut Al and Farmer Fred. The vehicles included in the show are Dan The Breakdown Van, Bus, Bike, Plane, Spaceship, Boat, Tractor and Big Rig The Truck.

The main character voices were provided by television double act, Anthony McPartlin and Declan Donnelly. In the first series, Dec voiced the title role of Engie Benjy while Ant provided the vocal effects for his dog, Jollop. In the third series after a pay dispute, another character was added for Ant to voice: Trucker Troy, Engie Benjy's cousin. Astronaut Al and Pilot Pete were voiced by Family Fortunes presenter, Les Dennis, Driver Dottie by Teresa Gallagher (who also originally voiced Engie prior to Dec providing the voice), and Fisherman Fin, Farmer Fred, and Messenger Mo by David Holt.

The theme tune was composed and sung by Clint Boon, the keyboard player with the Inspiral Carpets, with character voices by Ant and Dec.

The show was created by Bridget Appleby at Cosgrove Hall Films, and first shown on CITV, and it is also seen on Nick Jr. Four series of 13 episodes were made, with first broadcasts from 2002 to 2005. It has been sold in over 80 territories worldwide.

In Australia, the show was aired on ABC (Australia) and Nick Jr. (Australian and New Zealand TV channel), Sveriges Television in Sweden, France 5 and Piwi+ in France, YLE in Finland, NRK in Norway, Discovery Kids (Latin American TV channel) in Latin America, Rádio e Televisão de Portugal in Portugal, NPO Zappelin in The Netherlands, Çufo, Bang Bang (TV channel) and Top Channel in Albania, KIKA and ZDF in Germany, Alter Channel in Greece, Hop! Channel in Israel, Educational Broadcasting System in South Korea, Telewizja Polska in Poland, Radio Television of Serbia in Serbia, Radio and Television of Slovakia in Slovakia, Télé-Quebec in Canada, Discovery Kids (Latin American TV channel) in Latin America, Radiotelevizija Slovenija in Slovenia, Stöð 2 in Iceland and Sunflower TV in Ukraine.

In 2009, Engie Benjy along with several other well known children's characters appeared on The Official BBC Children in Need Medley by Peter Kay's Animated All Star Band. The final episode aired on 29 November 2004.  Reruns of the series aired on ITVBe's children's block LittleBe between September 2018 and July 2021.

Episodes

Series 1 (2002)

Series 2 (2003)

Series 3 (2004)

Series 4 (2004)

Home releases
Six VHS tapes and DVDs of all the episodes were issued between 2003 and 2005 by VCI and Granada Ventures.

References

External links

Ant & Dec
2000s British children's television series
Australian Broadcasting Corporation original programming
British children's animated adventure television series
English-language television shows
ITV children's television shows
British stop-motion animated television series
British computer-animated television series
British preschool education television series
Animated preschool education television series
2000s preschool education television series
Fictional mechanics
2000s British animated television series
2002 British television series debuts
2004 British television series endings
Television series by Cosgrove Hall Films